Fleetwood Mac are a British-American rock band, formed in London in 1967. Fleetwood Mac were founded by guitarists and vocalists Peter Green and Jeremy Spencer and drummer Mick Fleetwood. Bob Brunning was hired as a temporary bass guitarist before John McVie joined the line-up in time for their eponymous debut album. Danny Kirwan joined as a third guitarist and vocalist in 1968. Keyboardist and vocalist Christine Perfect, who contributed as a session musician starting with the band's second album while she was a member of Chicken Shack, married McVie and joined Fleetwood Mac as a full member in 1970, becoming known as Christine McVie.

Primarily a British blues band at first, Fleetwood Mac achieved a UK number one with "Albatross", and had other hits such as the singles "Oh Well", "Man of the World", and "The Green Manalishi". Green, Spencer and Kirwan all left in succession during the early 1970s, replaced by guitarist and vocalist Bob Welch, guitarist Bob Weston and vocalist Dave Walker. By 1974, Welch, Weston and Walker had all either departed or been dismissed, leaving the band without a male vocalist or a guitarist. In late 1974, while Fleetwood was scouting studios in Los Angeles, he heard the American folk-rock duo Lindsey Buckingham and Stevie Nicks. He asked Buckingham to be their new guitarist and vocalist with Buckingham agreeing on the condition that Nicks could also join as vocalist.

The addition of Buckingham and Nicks gave the band a more pop rock sound and their 1975 album Fleetwood Mac reached No. 1 in the United States. Rumours (1977) produced four U.S. Top 10 singles and remained at number one on the American albums chart for 31 weeks. It also reached the top spot in countries around the world and won a Grammy Award for Album of the Year in 1978. Rumours has sold more than 40 million copies worldwide, making it one of the best-selling albums in history. Although each member of the band went through a breakup (John and Christine McVie, Buckingham and Nicks, and Fleetwood and his wife Jenny Boyd) while recording the album, they continued to write and record together.

The lineup remained stable through three more studio albums, but by the late 1980s began to disintegrate. After Buckingham and Nicks left, they were replaced by a number of other guitarists and vocalists. A 1993 one-off performance for the first inauguration of President Bill Clinton reunited Fleetwood, Nicks and Buckingham, and John and Christine McVie for the first time in six years. A full reunion occurred four years later, and Fleetwood Mac released their fourth U.S. No. 1 album, The Dance (1997), a live compilation of their hits, also marking the 20th anniversary of Rumours. Christine McVie left in 1998, but continued to work with the band in a session capacity. They continued as a four-piece, releasing their most recent studio album, Say You Will, in 2003. Christine McVie rejoined in 2014. In 2018, Buckingham was fired and replaced by Mike Campbell, formerly of Tom Petty and the Heartbreakers and Neil Finn of Split Enz and Crowded House. Christine McVie died in 2022.

Fleetwood Mac have sold more than 120 million records worldwide, making them one of the world's best-selling bands. In 1979, the group were honoured with a star on the Hollywood Walk of Fame. In 1998 the band were inducted into the Rock and Roll Hall of Fame and received the Brit Award for Outstanding Contribution to Music. In 2018, the band received the MusiCares Person of the Year award from The Recording Academy in recognition of their artistic achievement in the music industry and dedication to philanthropy.

History

1967–1970: Formation and early years

Fleetwood Mac were formed in July 1967 in London, England, by Peter Green after he left the British blues band John Mayall & the Bluesbreakers. Green had previously replaced guitarist Eric Clapton in the Bluesbreakers and had received critical acclaim for his work on their album A Hard Road. Green had been in two bands with Mick Fleetwood, Peter B's Looners and the subsequent Shotgun Express (which featured a young Rod Stewart as vocalist), and suggested Fleetwood as a replacement for drummer Aynsley Dunbar when Dunbar left the Bluesbreakers to join the new Jeff Beck/Rod Stewart band. John Mayall agreed and Fleetwood joined the Bluesbreakers.

The Bluesbreakers then consisted of Green, Fleetwood, John McVie and Mayall. Mayall gave Green free recording time as a gift, which Fleetwood, McVie and Green used to record five songs. The fifth song was an instrumental that Green named after the rhythm section, "Fleetwood Mac" ("Mac" being short for McVie).

Soon after this, Green suggested to Fleetwood that they form a new band. The pair wanted McVie on bass guitar and named the band "Fleetwood Mac" to entice him, but McVie opted to keep his steady income with Mayall rather than take a risk with a new band. In the meantime Green and Fleetwood teamed up with slide guitarist Jeremy Spencer and bassist Bob Brunning. Brunning was in the band on the understanding that he would leave if McVie agreed to join. The Green, Fleetwood, Spencer, Brunning version of the band made its debut on 13 August 1967 at the Windsor Jazz and Blues Festival as "Peter Green's Fleetwood Mac, also featuring Jeremy Spencer". Brunning played only a few gigs with Fleetwood Mac. Within weeks of this show, John McVie agreed to join the band as permanent bassist.

Fleetwood Mac's self-titled debut album was a blues rock album and was released by the Blue Horizon label in February 1968. There were no other players on the album (except on the song "Long Grey Mare", which was recorded with Brunning on bass). The album was successful in the UK and reached no. 4, although no tracks were released as singles. Later in the year the singles "Black Magic Woman" (later a big hit for Santana) and "Need Your Love So Bad" were released.

The band's second studio album, Mr. Wonderful, was released in August 1968. Like their first album, it was all blues. The album was recorded live in the studio with miked amplifiers and a PA system, rather than being plugged into the board. They also added horns and featured a friend of the band on keyboards, Christine Perfect of Chicken Shack.

Shortly after the release of Mr. Wonderful, Fleetwood Mac recruited 18-year-old guitarist Danny Kirwan. He was in the South London blues trio Boilerhouse, consisting of Kirwan (guitar), Trevor Stevens (bass) and Dave Terrey (drums). Green and Fleetwood had watched Boilerhouse rehearse in a basement boiler-room, and Green had been so impressed that he invited the band to play support slots for Fleetwood Mac. Green wanted Boilerhouse to become a professional band but Stevens and Terrey were not prepared to turn professional, so Green tried to find another rhythm section for Kirwan by placing an ad in Melody Maker. There were over 300 applicants, but when Green and Fleetwood ran auditions at the Nag's Head in Battersea (home of the Mike Vernon Blue Horizon Club) the hard-to-please Green could not find anyone good enough. Fleetwood invited Kirwan to join Fleetwood Mac as a third guitarist.

Green was frustrated that Jeremy Spencer did not contribute to his songs. Kirwan, a talented self-taught guitarist, had a signature vibrato and a unique style that added a new dimension to the band's sound. In November 1968, with Kirwan in the band, they released their first number one single in Europe, "Albatross", on which Kirwan duetted with Green. Green said later that the success of "Albatross" was thanks to Kirwan. "If it wasn't for Danny, I would never have had a number one hit record." In January 1969 they released their first compilation album English Rose, which contained half of Mr Wonderful plus new songs from Kirwan. Their next and more successful compilation album The Pious Bird of Good Omen was released in August and contained various singles, B-sides and tracks the band had done with Eddie Boyd.

On tour in the US in January 1969, the band recorded Fleetwood Mac in Chicago (released in December as a double album) at the soon-to-close Chess Records Studio with some of the blues legends of Chicago, including Willie Dixon, Buddy Guy and Otis Spann. These were Fleetwood Mac's last all-blues recordings. Along with the change of style the band was also going through label changes. Until that point they had been on the Blue Horizon label, but with Kirwan in the band the musical possibilities had become too diverse for a blues-only label. The band signed with Immediate Records and released the single "Man of the World", which became another British and European hit. For the B-side Spencer fronted Fleetwood Mac as "Earl Vince and the Valiants" and recorded "Somebody's Gonna Get Their Head Kicked In Tonite", typifying the more raucous rock 'n' roll side of the band. Immediate Records was in bad shape however, so the band shopped around for a new deal. The Beatles wanted the band on Apple Records (Mick Fleetwood and George Harrison were brothers-in-law), but the band's manager Clifford Davis decided to go with Warner Bros. Records (through Reprise Records, a Frank Sinatra-founded label), the label they have stayed with ever since.

Under the wing of Reprise, Fleetwood Mac released their third studio album, Then Play On, in September 1969. Although the initial pressing of the American release of this album was the same as the British version, it was altered to contain the song "Oh Well", which featured consistently in live performances from the time of its release through 1997 and again starting in 2009. Then Play On, the band's first rock album, was written by Kirwan and Green, plus a track each by Fleetwood and McVie. Jeremy Spencer, meanwhile, had recorded a solo album of 1950s-style rock and roll songs, backed by the rest of the band except Green.

By 1970, Green, the frontman of the band, was using LSD. During the band's European tour, he experienced a bad acid trip at a hippie commune in Munich. Clifford Davis, the band's manager, singled out this incident as the crucial point in Green's mental decline. He said: "The truth about Peter Green and how he ended up how he did is very simple. We were touring Europe in late 1969. When we were in Germany, Peter told me he had been invited to a party. I knew there were going to be a lot of drugs around and I suggested that he didn't go. But he went anyway and I understand from him that he took what turned out to be very bad, impure LSD. He was never the same again." German author and filmmaker Rainer Langhans stated in his autobiography that he and Uschi Obermaier met Green in Munich and invited him to their Highfisch-Kommune, where the drinks were spiked with acid. Langhans and Obermaier were planning to organise an open-air "Bavarian Woodstock", for which they wanted Jimi Hendrix and The Rolling Stones to be the main acts and they hoped Green would help them to get in contact with The Rolling Stones.

Green's last hit with Fleetwood Mac was "The Green Manalishi (With the Two-Prong Crown)". The track was recorded at Warner-Reprise's studios in Hollywood on the band's third US tour in April 1970, a few weeks before Green left the band. A live performance was recorded at the Boston Tea Party in February 1970, and the song was later recorded by Judas Priest. "Green Manalishi" was released as Green's mental stability deteriorated. He wanted the band to give all their money to charity, but the other members of the band disagreed.

In April, Green decided to quit the band after the completion of their European tour. His last show with Fleetwood Mac was on 20 May 1970. During that show the band went past their allotted time and the power was shut off, although Mick Fleetwood kept drumming. Some of the Boston Tea Party recordings (5/6/7 February 1970) were eventually released in the 1980s as the Live in Boston album. A more complete remastered three-volume compilation was released by Snapper Music in the late 1990s.

1970–1974: Transitional era
Kirwan and Spencer were left with the task of replacing Green in their live shows and on their recordings, as they set about work on their next album. In September 1970, Fleetwood Mac released their fourth studio album, Kiln House, to generally positive reviews. Kirwan's songs on the album moved the band in the direction of rock, while Spencer's contributions focused on re-creating the country-tinged "Sun Sound" of the late 1950s. Christine Perfect, who had retired from the music business after one unsuccessful solo album, contributed (uncredited) to Kiln House, singing backup vocals and playing keyboards. She also drew the album cover. After Kiln House, Fleetwood Mac were progressing and developing a new sound, and she was invited to join the band to help fill in the rhythm section. They released a single, Danny Kirwan's "Dragonfly" b/w "The Purple Dancer" in the UK and certain European countries, but despite good notices in the press it was not a success. The B-side has been reissued only once, on a Reprise German and Dutch-only "Best of" album. The single was re-issued on 19 April 2014 for Record Store Day (RSD) 2014 in Europe on Blue Vinyl and in the U.S. on translucent purple vinyl.

Christine Perfect, who by this point had married bassist John McVie, made her first appearance with the band as Christine McVie at Bristol University, England, in May 1969, just as she was leaving Chicken Shack. She had had success with the Etta James classic "I'd Rather Go Blind" and was twice voted female artist of the year in England. Christine McVie played her first gig as an official member of Fleetwood Mac on 1 August 1970 in New Orleans, Louisiana. CBS Records, which now owned Blue Horizon (except in the US and Canada), released the band's fourth compilation album, The Original Fleetwood Mac, containing previously unreleased material. The album was relatively successful, and the band continued to gain popularity.

While on tour in February 1971, Jeremy Spencer said he was going out to "get a magazine" but never returned. After several days of frantic searching the band discovered that Spencer had joined a religious group, the Children of God. The band were liable for the remaining shows on the tour and asked Peter Green to step in as a replacement. Green brought along his friend Nigel Watson, who played the congas. (Twenty-five years later Green and Watson collaborated again to form the Peter Green Splinter Group). Green was only back with Fleetwood Mac temporarily and the band began a search for a new guitarist. Green insisted on playing only new material and none he had written. He and Watson played only the last week of shows. The San Bernardino show on 20 February was taped.

In the summer of 1971, the band held auditions for a replacement guitarist at their large country home, "Benifold", which they had jointly bought with their manager Davis for £23,000 prior to the Kiln House tour. A friend of the band, Judy Wong, recommended her high school friend Bob Welch, who was living in Paris, France, at the time. The band held a few meetings with Welch and decided to hire him, without actually playing with him, after they heard a tape of his songs.

In September 1971, the band released their fifth studio album, Future Games. As a result of Welch's arrival and Spencer's departure, the album was different from anything they had done previously. While it became the band's first studio album to miss the charts in the UK, it helped to expand the band's appeal in the United States. In Europe CBS released Fleetwood Mac's first Greatest Hits album, which mostly consisted of songs by Peter Green, with one song by Spencer and one by Kirwan.

In 1972, six months after the release of Future Games, the band released their sixth studio album, Bare Trees. Mostly composed by Kirwan, Bare Trees featured the Welch-penned single "Sentimental Lady", which would be a much bigger hit for Welch five years later when he re-recorded it for his solo album French Kiss, backed by Mick Fleetwood and Christine McVie. Bare Trees also featured "Spare Me a Little of Your Love", a bright Christine McVie song that became a staple of the band's live act throughout the early to mid-1970s.

While the band was doing well in the studio, their tours started to be problematic. By 1972 Danny Kirwan had developed an alcohol dependency and was becoming alienated from Welch and the McVies. When Kirwan smashed his Gibson Les Paul Custom guitar before a concert on a US tour in August 1972, refused to go on stage and criticised the band afterwards, Fleetwood fired him. Fleetwood said later that the pressure had become too much for Kirwan, and he had suffered a breakdown.

In the three albums they released in this period they constantly changed line-ups. In September 1972 the band added guitarist Bob Weston and vocalist Dave Walker, formerly of Savoy Brown and Idle Race. Bob Weston was well known as a slide guitarist and had known the band from his touring period with Long John Baldry. Fleetwood Mac also hired Savoy Brown's road manager, John Courage. Fleetwood, The McVies, Welch, Weston and Walker recorded the band's seventh studio album, Penguin, which was released in January 1973. After the tour the band fired Walker because they felt his vocal style and attitude did not fit well with the rest of the band.

The remaining five members carried on and recorded the band's eighth studio album, Mystery to Me, six months later. This album contained Welch's song "Hypnotized", which received a great amount of airplay on the radio and became one of the band's most successful songs to date in the US. The band was proud of the new album and anticipated that it would be a smash hit. While it did eventually go Gold, personal problems within the band emerged. The McVies' marriage was under a lot of stress, which was aggravated by their constant working with each other and by John McVie's considerable alcohol abuse. Subsequent lack of touring meant that the album was unable to chart as high as the previous one.

During the 1973 US tour to promote Mystery to Me, Weston had an affair with Fleetwood's wife Jenny Boyd Fleetwood, sister of Pattie Boyd Harrison. Fleetwood was said to have been devastated by this, and could not continue with the tour. Courage fired Weston and two weeks in, with another 26 concerts scheduled, the tour was cancelled. The last date played was Lincoln, Nebraska, on 20 October 1973. In a late-night meeting after that show, the band told their sound engineer that the tour was over and Fleetwood Mac was splitting up.

1974: Name dispute and "fake Fleetwood Mac"
In late 1973, after the collapse of the US tour, the band's manager, Clifford Davis, was left with major touring commitments to fulfill and no band. Fleetwood Mac had "temporarily disbanded" in Nebraska and its members had gone their separate ways. Davis was concerned that failing to complete the tour would destroy his reputation with bookers and promoters. He sent the band a letter in which he said he "hadn't slaved for years to be brought down by the whims of irresponsible musicians". Davis claimed that he owned the name 'Fleetwood Mac' and the right to choose the band members, and he recruited members of the band Legs, which had recently issued one single under Davis's management, to tour the US in early 1974 under the name "The New Fleetwood Mac" and perform the rescheduled dates. This band — who former vocalist Dave Walker said were "very good" — consisted of Elmer Gantry (Dave Terry, formerly of Velvet Opera: vocals, guitar), Kirby Gregory (formerly of Curved Air: guitar), Paul Martinez (formerly of the Downliners Sect: bass), John Wilkinson (also known as Dave Wilkinson: 
keyboards) and Australian drummer Craig Collinge (formerly of Manfred Mann Chapter Three, The Librettos, Procession and Third World War).

The members of this group were told that Fleetwood would join them after the tour had started, to validate the use of the name, and claimed that he had been involved in planning it. Davis and others stated that Fleetwood had committed himself to the project and had given instructions to hire musicians and rehearse the band. Davis said Collinge had been hired only as a temporary stand-in drummer for rehearsals and the first two gigs, and claimed that Fleetwood had agreed to appear on the rest of the tour, but then had backed out after the tour started. Fleetwood said later that he had not promised to appear on the tour.

The "New Fleetwood Mac" tour began on 16 January 1974 at the Syria Mosque in Pittsburgh, Pennsylvania, and was initially successful. One of the band members said the first concert "went down a storm". The promoter was dubious at first, but said later that the crowd had loved the band and they were "actually really good". More successful gigs followed, but then word got around that this was not the real Fleetwood Mac and audiences became hostile. The band was turned away from several gigs and the next half-dozen were pulled by promoters. The band struggled on and played further dates in the face of increasing hostility and heckling, more dates were pulled, the keyboard player quit, and after a concert in Edmonton where bottles were thrown at the stage, the tour collapsed. The band dissolved and the remainder of the tour was cancelled.

The lawsuit that followed regarding who owned the rights to the name "Fleetwood Mac" put the original Fleetwood Mac on hiatus for almost a year. Although the band was named after Mick Fleetwood and John McVie, they had apparently signed contracts in which they had forfeited the rights to the name. Their record company, Warner Bros. Records, when appealed to, said they didn't know who owned it. The dispute was eventually settled out of court, four years later, in what was described as "a reasonable settlement not unfair to either party". In later years Fleetwood said that, in the end, he was grateful to Davis because the lawsuit was the reason the band moved to California.

Nobody from the alternative line-up was ever made a part of the real Fleetwood Mac, although some of them later played in Danny Kirwan's studio band. Gantry and Gregory went on to become members of Stretch, whose 1975 UK hit single "Why Did You Do It?" was written about the touring debacle. Gantry later collaborated with the Alan Parsons Project. Martinez went on to play with the Deep Purple offshoot Paice Ashton Lord, as well as Robert Plant's backing band.

1974: Return of the authentic Fleetwood Mac
While the other band had been on tour, Welch stayed in Los Angeles and connected with entertainment attorneys. He realised that the original Fleetwood Mac was being neglected by Warner Bros and that they would need to change their base of operation from England to America, to which the rest of the band agreed. Rock promoter Bill Graham wrote a letter to Warner Bros to convince them that the real Fleetwood Mac was, in fact, Fleetwood, Welch, and the McVies. This did not end the legal battle but the band was able to record as Fleetwood Mac again. Instead of hiring another manager, Fleetwood Mac, having re-formed, became the only major rock band managed by the artists themselves.

In September 1974, Fleetwood Mac signed a new recording contract with Warner Bros, but remained on the Reprise label. In the same month the band released their ninth studio album, Heroes Are Hard to Find. This was the first time Fleetwood Mac had only one guitarist. While on tour they added a second keyboardist, Doug Graves, who had been an engineer on Heroes Are Hard to Find. In late 1974 Graves was preparing to become a permanent member of the band by the end of their US tour. He said:

However, Graves did not ultimately join full-time. In 1980, Christine McVie explained the decision:

Keyboard player Robert ("Bobby") Hunt, who had been in the band Head West with Bob Welch back in 1970, replaced Graves for the remaining dates on the tour but was not invited to join the band full time. By the time the tour ended (on 5 December 1974 at Cal State University) it had enabled the Heroes album to reach a higher position on the American charts than any of the band's previous records.

1975–1987: Addition of Buckingham and Nicks, and global success

In Bob Welch's words, following the Heroes are Hard to Find tour "the buzz that the Mystery to Me band had started to create...(was) gone. I (was) totally exhausted by writing, singing, touring, negotiating, moving, and frankly so (were) Mick, John and Chris. We were all discouraged that "Heroes.." (hadn't) done better. Something needs to change, but what? ...There was also a kind of fatigue, anger and bitterness that all the work we had done hadn't really paid off and we were just all sort of shaking our heads saying "what do we do now"... Everybody knew that we had to find some new creative juice." Welch himself had grown tired of the constant struggles to keep Fleetwood Mac functioning, and was openly considering leaving the band, a process which he'd later describe as "I hemmed and hawed for months".

Whilst Fleetwood was checking out Sound City Studios in Los Angeles during the autumn of 1974, the house engineer, Keith Olsen, played him a track he had recorded, "Frozen Love", from the album Buckingham Nicks (1973). Fleetwood liked it and was introduced to the guitarist from the band, Lindsey Buckingham, who was at Sound City that day recording demos. Fleetwood asked him to join Fleetwood Mac, and Buckingham agreed, on the condition that his music partner and girlfriend, Stevie Nicks, be included. Welch considered remaining as part of this extended lineup, but opted to depart for a solo career, with Buckingham and Nicks joining the band on New Year's Eve 1974.

In 1975, the new line-up released another self-titled album, their tenth studio album. The album was a breakthrough for the band and became a huge hit, reaching No.1 in the US and selling over 7 million copies. Among the hit singles from this album were Christine McVie's "Over My Head" and "Say You Love Me" and Stevie Nicks's "Rhiannon", as well as the much-played album track "Landslide", a live rendition of which became a hit twenty years later on The Dance album.

In 1976, the band was suffering from severe stress. With success came the end of John and Christine McVie's marriage, as well as Buckingham and Nicks's long-term romantic relationship. Fleetwood, meanwhile, was in the midst of divorce proceedings from his wife, Jenny; and also carrying on an affair with Nicks. The pressure on Fleetwood Mac to release a successful follow-up album, combined with their new-found wealth, led to creative and personal tensions which were allegedly fuelled by high consumption of drugs and alcohol.

The band's eleventh studio album, Rumours (the band's first release on the main Warner label after Reprise was retired and all of its acts were reassigned to the parent label), was released in February 1977. In this album, the band members laid bare the emotional turmoil they were experiencing at the time. Rumours was critically acclaimed and won the Grammy Award for Album of the Year in 1977. The album generated four Top Ten singles: Buckingham's "Go Your Own Way", Nicks's US No. 1 "Dreams", and Christine McVie's "Don't Stop" and "You Make Loving Fun". Buckingham's "Second Hand News", Nicks's "Gold Dust Woman", and "The Chain" (the only song written by all five band members) also received significant radio airplay. By 2003 Rumours had sold over 19 million copies in the US alone (certified as a diamond album by the RIAA) and a total of 40 million copies worldwide, bringing it to eighth on the list of best-selling albums. Fleetwood Mac supported the album with a lucrative tour.

On 10 October 1979, Fleetwood Mac were honoured with a star on the Hollywood Walk of Fame for their contributions to the music industry at 6608 Hollywood Boulevard.

Buckingham convinced Fleetwood to let his work on their next album be more experimental and to be allowed to work on tracks at home before bringing them to the rest of the band in the studio. The result of this, the band's twelfth studio album Tusk, was a 20-track double album released in 1979. It produced three hit singles: Buckingham's "Tusk" (US No. 8), which featured the USC Trojan Marching Band, Christine McVie's "Think About Me" (US No. 20), and 
Nicks's six-and-a-half minute opus "Sara" (US No. 7). "Sara" was cut to four-and-a-half minutes for both the hit single and the first CD-release of the album, but the unedited version has since been restored on the 1988 greatest hits compilation, the 2004 reissue of Tusk and Fleetwood Mac's 2002 release of The Very Best of Fleetwood Mac. Original guitarist Peter Green also took part in the sessions of Tusk although his playing, on the Christine McVie track "Brown Eyes", is not credited on the album. In an interview in 2019 Fleetwood described Tusk as his "personal favourite" and said, “Kudos to Lindsey ... for us not doing a replica of Rumours."

Tusk sold four million copies worldwide. Fleetwood blamed the album's relative lack of commercial success on the RKO radio chain having played the album in its entirety prior to release, thereby allowing mass home taping.

The band embarked on an 11-month tour to support and promote Tusk. They travelled around the world, including the US, Australia, New Zealand, Japan, France, Belgium, Germany, the Netherlands, and the United Kingdom. In Germany, they shared the bill with reggae superstar Bob Marley. On this world tour, the band recorded music for their first live album, which was released at the end of 1980.

The band's thirteenth studio album, Mirage, was released in 1982. Following 1981 solo albums by Nicks (Bella Donna), Fleetwood (The Visitor), and Buckingham (Law and Order), there was a return to a more conventional approach. Buckingham had been chided by critics, fellow band members, and music business managers for the lesser commercial success of Tusk. Recorded at Château d'Hérouville in France and produced by Richard Dashut, Mirage was an attempt to recapture the huge success of Rumours. Its hits included Christine McVie's "Hold Me" and "Love in Store" (cowritten by Robbie Patton and Jim Recor, respectively), Nicks's "Gypsy", and Buckingham's "Oh Diane", which made the Top 10 in the UK. A minor hit was also scored by Buckingham's "Eyes of the World" and "Can't Go Back".

In contrast to the Tusk Tour the band embarked on only a short tour of 18 American cities, the Los Angeles show being recorded and released on video. They also headlined the first US Festival, on 5 September 1982, for which the band was paid $500,000 ($ today). Mirage was certified double platinum in the US.

Following Mirage the band went on hiatus, which allowed members to pursue solo careers. Nicks released two more solo albums (1983's The Wild Heart and 1985's Rock a Little). Buckingham issued Go Insane in 1984, the same year that Christine McVie made an eponymous album (yielding the Top 10 hit "Got a Hold on Me" and the Top 40 hit "Love Will Show Us How"). All three met with success, Nicks being the most popular. During this period Fleetwood had filed for bankruptcy, Nicks was admitted to the Betty Ford Clinic for addiction problems and John McVie had suffered an addiction-related seizure, all of which were attributed to the lifestyle of excess afforded to them by their worldwide success. It was rumoured that Fleetwood Mac had disbanded, but Buckingham commented that he was unhappy at allowing Mirage to remain the band's last effort.

The Rumours line-up of Fleetwood Mac recorded one more album, their fourteenth studio album, Tango in the Night, in 1987. As with various other Fleetwood Mac albums, the material started off as a Buckingham solo album before becoming a group project. The album went on to become their best-selling release since Rumours, especially in the UK where it hit No. 1 three times in the following year. The album sold three million copies in the US and contained four hits: Christine McVie's "Little Lies" and "Everywhere" ("Little Lies" being cowritten with McVie's new husband, Eddy Quintela), Sandy Stewart and Nicks's "Seven Wonders", and Buckingham's "Big Love". "Family Man" (Buckingham and Richard Dashut) and "Isn't It Midnight" (Christine McVie) were also released as singles, with less success.

1987–1995: Departure of Buckingham and Nicks
With a ten-week tour scheduled, Buckingham held back at the last minute, saying he felt his creativity was being stifled. A group meeting at Christine McVie's house on 7 August 1987 resulted in turmoil. Tensions were coming to a head. Fleetwood said in his autobiography that there was a physical altercation between Buckingham and Nicks. Buckingham left the band the following day. After Buckingham's departure, Fleetwood Mac added two new guitarists to the band, Billy Burnette and Rick Vito, again without auditions.

Burnette was the son of Dorsey Burnette and nephew of Johnny Burnette, both of The Rock and Roll Trio. He had already worked with Fleetwood in Zoo, with Christine McVie as part of her solo band, had done some session work with Nicks, and backed Buckingham on Saturday Night Live. Fleetwood and Christine McVie had played on his Try Me album in 1985. Vito, a Peter Green admirer, had played with many artists from Bonnie Raitt to John Mayall, to Roger McGuinn in Thunderbyrd and worked with John McVie on two Mayall albums.

The 1987–88 "Shake the Cage" tour was the first outing for this line-up. It was successful enough to warrant the release of a concert video, entitled "Tango in the Night", which was filmed at San Francisco's Cow Palace arena in December 1987.

Capitalising on the success of Tango in the Night, the band released a Greatest Hits album in 1988. It featured singles from the 1975–1988 era and included two new compositions, "No Questions Asked" written by Nicks and "As Long as You Follow", written by Christine McVie and Quintela. 'As Long as You Follow' was released as a single in 1988 but only made No. 43 in the US and No.66 in the UK, although it reached No.1 on the US Adult Contemporary charts. The Greatest Hits album, which peaked at No. 3 in the UK and No. 14 in the US (though it has since sold over 8 million copies there) was dedicated by the band to Buckingham, with whom they were now reconciled.

In 1990, Fleetwood Mac released their fifteenth studio album, Behind the Mask. With this album, the band veered away from the stylised sound that Buckingham had evolved during his tenure (which was also evident in his solo work) and developed a more adult contemporary style with producer Greg Ladanyi. The album yielded only one Top 40 hit, Christine McVie's "Save Me". Behind the Mask only achieved Gold album status in the US, peaking at No. 18 on the Billboard album chart, though it entered the UK Albums Chart at No. 1. It received mixed reviews and was seen by some music critics as a low point for the band in the absence of Buckingham (who had actually made a guest appearance playing on the title track). But Rolling Stone magazine said that Vito and Burnette were "the best thing to ever happen to Fleetwood Mac". The subsequent "Behind the Mask" tour saw the band play sold-out shows at London's Wembley Stadium. In the final show in Los Angeles, Buckingham joined the band onstage. The two women of the band, McVie and Nicks, had decided that the tour would be their last (McVie's father had died during the tour), although both stated that they would still record with the band. In 1991, however, Nicks and Rick Vito left Fleetwood Mac altogether.

In 1992, Fleetwood arranged a 4-disc box set, spanning highlights from the band's 25-year history, entitled 25 Years – The Chain (an edited 2-disc set was also available). A notable inclusion in the box set was "Silver Springs", a Nicks composition that was recorded during the Rumours sessions but was omitted from the album and used as the B-side of "Go Your Own Way". Nicks had requested use of this track for her 1991 best-of compilation TimeSpace, but Fleetwood had refused as he had planned to include it in this collection as a rarity. The disagreement between Nicks and Fleetwood garnered press coverage and was believed to have been the main reason for Nicks leaving the band in 1991. The box set also included a new Nicks/Rick Vito composition, "Paper Doll", which was released in the US as a single and produced by Buckingham and Richard Dashut. There were also two new Christine McVie compositions, "Heart of Stone" and "Love Shines". "Love Shines" was released as a single in the UK and elsewhere. Buckingham also contributed a new song, "Make Me a Mask". Fleetwood also released a deluxe hardcover companion book to coincide with the release of the box set, titled My 25 Years in Fleetwood Mac. The volume featured notes written by Fleetwood detailing the band's 25-year history and many rare photographs.

The Buckingham/Nicks/McVie/McVie/Fleetwood lineup reunited in 1993 at the request of US President Bill Clinton for his first Inaugural Ball. Clinton had made Fleetwood Mac's "Don't Stop" his campaign theme song. His request for it to be performed at the Inauguration Ball was met with enthusiasm by the band, although this line-up had no intention of reuniting again.

Inspired by the new interest in the band, Mick Fleetwood, John McVie, and Christine McVie recorded another album as Fleetwood Mac, with Billy Burnette taking lead guitar duties. Burnette left in March 1993 to record a country album and pursue an acting career and Bekka Bramlett, who had worked a year earlier with Fleetwood's Zoo, was recruited to take his place. Solo singer-songwriter/guitarist and Traffic member Dave Mason, who had worked with Bekka's parents Delaney & Bonnie twenty-five years earlier, was subsequently added. In March 1994 Billy Burnette, a good friend and co-songwriter with Delaney Bramlett, returned to the band with Fleetwood's blessing.

The band, minus Christine McVie, toured in 1994, opening for Crosby, Stills, & Nash and in 1995 as part of a package with REO Speedwagon and Pat Benatar. This tour saw the band perform classic Fleetwood Mac songs from their 1967–1974 era. In 1995, at a concert in Tokyo, the band was greeted by former member Jeremy Spencer, who performed a few songs with them.

On 10 October 1995, Fleetwood Mac released their sixteenth studio album, Time, which was not a success. Although it hit the UK Top 60 for one week, the album had zero impact in the US. It failed to graze the Billboard Top 200 albums chart, a reversal for a band that had been a mainstay on that chart for most of the previous two decades. Shortly after the album's release, Christine McVie informed the band that the album would be her last. Bramlett and Burnette subsequently formed a country music duo, Bekka & Billy.

1995–2007: Reformation, reunion, and Christine McVie's departure 
Just weeks after disbanding Fleetwood Mac, Mick Fleetwood started working with Lindsey Buckingham again. John McVie was added to the sessions, and later Christine McVie. Stevie Nicks also enlisted Buckingham to produce a song for a soundtrack. In May 1996, Fleetwood, John McVie, Christine McVie, and Nicks performed together at a private party in Louisville, Kentucky, prior to the Kentucky Derby, with Steve Winwood filling in for Buckingham. A week later, the Twister film soundtrack was released, which featured the Nicks-Buckingham duet "Twisted", with Fleetwood on drums. This eventually led to a full reunion of the Rumours line-up, which officially reformed in March 1997.

The regrouped Fleetwood Mac performed a live concert on a soundstage at Warner Bros. Burbank, California, on 22 May 1997. The concert was recorded, and from this performance came the 1997 live album The Dance, which brought the band back to the top of the US album charts for the first time in 10 years. The Dance returned Fleetwood Mac to a superstar status they had not enjoyed since Tango in the Night. The album was certified 5 million units by the RIAA. An arena tour followed the MTV premiere of The Dance and kept the reunited Fleetwood Mac on the road throughout much of 1997, the 20th anniversary of Rumours. With additional musicians Neale Heywood on guitar, Brett Tuggle on keyboards, Lenny Castro on percussion and Sharon Celani (who had toured with the band in the late 1980s) and Mindy Stein on backing vocals, this would be the final appearance of the classic line-up including Christine McVie for 16 years. Neale Heywood and Sharon Celani remain touring members to this day.

In 1998 Fleetwood Mac were inducted into the Rock and Roll Hall of Fame. Members inducted included the original band, Mick Fleetwood, John McVie, Peter Green, Jeremy Spencer, and Danny Kirwan, and Rumours-era members Christine McVie, Stevie Nicks, and Lindsey Buckingham. Bob Welch was not included, despite his key role in keeping the band alive during the early 1970s. The Rumours-era version of the band performed both at the induction ceremony and at the Grammy Awards programme that year. Peter Green attended the induction ceremony but did not perform with his former bandmates, opting instead to perform his composition "Black Magic Woman" with Santana, who were inducted the same night. Neither Jeremy Spencer nor Danny Kirwan attended. Fleetwood Mac also received the "Outstanding Contribution to Music" award at the Brit Awards (British Phonographic Industry Awards) the same year.

In 1998 Christine McVie left the band. Her departure left Buckingham and Nicks to sing all the lead vocals for the band's seventeenth album, Say You Will, released in 2003, although Christine contributed some backing vocals and keyboards. The album debuted at No.3 on the Billboard 200 chart (No. 6 in the UK) and yielded chart hits with "Peacekeeper" and the title track, and a successful world arena tour which lasted through 2004. The tour grossed $27,711,129 and was ranked No. 21 in the top 25 grossing tours of 2004.

Around 2004–05 there were rumours of a reunion of the early line-up of Fleetwood Mac involving Peter Green and Jeremy Spencer. While these two apparently remained unconvinced, in April 2006 bassist John McVie, during a question-and-answer session on the Penguin Fleetwood Mac fan website, said of the reunion idea:

In interviews given in November 2006 to support his solo album Under the Skin, Buckingham stated that plans for the band to reunite once more for a 2008 tour were still in the cards. Recording plans had been put on hold for the foreseeable future. In an interview Nicks gave to the UK newspaper The Daily Telegraph in September 2007, she stated that she was unwilling to carry on with the band unless Christine McVie returned.

2008–2013: Unleashed tour and Extended Play
In March 2008, it was mooted that Sheryl Crow might work with Fleetwood Mac in 2009. Crow and Stevie Nicks had collaborated in the past and Crow had stated that Nicks had been a great teacher and inspiration to her. Later, Buckingham said that the potential collaboration with Crow had "lost its momentum" and the idea was abandoned.

In March 2009, Fleetwood Mac started their "Unleashed" tour, again without Christine McVie. It was a greatest hits show, although album tracks such as "Storms" and "I Know I'm Not Wrong" were also played. During their show on 20 June 2009 in New Orleans, Louisiana, Stevie Nicks premiered part of a new song that she had written about Hurricane Katrina. The song was later released as "New Orleans" on Nicks's 2011 album In Your Dreams with Mick Fleetwood on drums. In October 2009 and November the band toured Europe, followed by Australia and New Zealand in December. In October, The Very Best of Fleetwood Mac was re-released in an extended two-disc format (this format having been released in the US in 2002), entering at number six on the UK Albums Chart. On 1 November 2009 a one-hour documentary, Fleetwood Mac: Don't Stop, was broadcast in the UK on BBC One, featuring recent interviews with all four current band members. During the documentary, Nicks gave a candid summary of the current state of her relationship with Buckingham, saying, "Maybe when we're 75 and Fleetwood Mac is a distant memory, we might be friends."

On 6 November 2009, Fleetwood Mac played the last show of the European leg of their Unleashed tour at London's Wembley Arena. Christine McVie was present in the audience. Nicks paid tribute to her from the stage to a standing ovation from the audience, saying that she thought about her former bandmate "every day", and dedicated that night's performance of "Landslide" to her. On 19 December 2009 Fleetwood Mac played the second-to-last show of their Unleashed tour to a sell-out crowd in New Zealand, at what was originally intended to be a one-off event at the TSB Bowl of Brooklands in New Plymouth. Tickets, after pre-sales, sold out within twelve minutes of public release. Another date, Sunday 20 December, was added and also sold out. The tour grossed $84,900,000 and was ranked No. 13 in the highest grossing worldwide tours of 2009. On 19 October 2010, Fleetwood Mac played a private show at the Phoenician Hotel in Scottsdale, Arizona for TPG (Texas Pacific Group).

On 3 May 2011, the Fox Network broadcast an episode of Glee entitled "Rumours" that featured six songs from the band's 1977 album. The show sparked renewed interest in the band and its commercially most successful album, and Rumours re-entered the Billboard 200 chart at No. 11 in the same week that Nicks's new solo album In Your Dreams debuted at No. 6. (She was quoted by Billboard saying that her new album was "my own little Rumours.") The two recordings sold about 30,000 and 52,000 units respectively. Music downloads accounted for 91 per cent of the Rumours sales. The spike in sales for Rumours represented an increase of 1,951%. It was the highest chart entry by a previously issued album since The Rolling Stones reissue of Exile On Main St. re-entered the chart at No. 2 on 5 June 2010. In an interview in July 2012 Nicks confirmed that the band would reunite for a tour in 2013.

Original Fleetwood Mac bassist Bob Brunning died on 18 October 2011 at the age of 68. Former guitarist and singer Bob Weston was found dead on 3 January 2012 at the age of 64. Former singer and guitarist Bob Welch was found dead from a self-inflicted gunshot wound on 7 June 2012 at the age of 66. Don Aaron, a spokesman at the scene, stated, "He died from an apparent self-inflicted gunshot wound to the chest." A suicide note was found. Welch had been struggling with health issues and was dealing with depression. His wife discovered his body.

The band's 2013 tour, which took place in 34 cities, started on 4 April in Columbus, Ohio. The band performed two new songs ("Sad Angel" and "Without You"), which Buckingham described as some of the most "Fleetwood Mac-ey"-sounding songs since Mirage. "Without You" was rerecorded from the Buckingham-Nicks era. The band released their first new studio material in ten years, Extended Play, on 30 April 2013. The EP debuted and peaked at No. 48 in the US and produced one single, "Sad Angel". On 25 and 27 September 2013, the second and third nights of the band's London O2 shows, Christine McVie joined them on stage for "Don't Stop".
On 27 October 2013, the band cancelled their New Zealand and Australian performances after John McVie had been diagnosed with cancer so that he could undergo treatment. They said: "We are sorry not to be able to play these Australian and New Zealand dates. We hope our Australian and New Zealand fans as well as Fleetwood Mac fans everywhere will join us in wishing John and his family all the best." Also in October 2013, Stevie Nicks appeared in American Horror Story: Coven with Fleetwood Mac's song "Seven Wonders" playing in the background. In November 2013, Christine McVie expressed interest in a return to Fleetwood Mac, and also affirmed that John McVie's prognosis was "really good".

2014–present: Return of Christine McVie, departure of Buckingham, and death of Christine McVie

On 11 January 2014, Mick Fleetwood confirmed that Christine McVie would be rejoining Fleetwood Mac. On with the Show, a 33-city North American tour, opened in Minneapolis, Minnesota, on 30 September 2014. A series of May–June 2015 arena dates in the United Kingdom went on sale on 14 November, selling out in minutes. Due to high demand, additional dates were added to the tour, including an Australian leg.

In January 2015, Buckingham suggested that the new album and tour might be Fleetwood Mac's last and that the band would cease operations in 2015 or soon afterwards. He concluded: "We're going to continue working on the new album and the solo stuff will take a back seat for a year or two. A beautiful way to wrap up this last act." But Mick Fleetwood stated that the new album might take a few years to complete and that they were waiting for contributions from Nicks, who had been ambivalent about committing to a new record.

In August 2016, Fleetwood revealed that while the band had "a huge amount of recorded music", virtually none of it featured Nicks. Buckingham and Christine McVie, however, had contributed multiple songs to the new project. Fleetwood told Ultimate Classic Rock: "She [McVie] wrote up a storm. She and Lindsey could probably have a mighty strong duet album if they want. In truth, I hope it will come to more than that. There really are dozens of songs. And they're really good. So we’ll see." Nicks explained her reluctance to record another album with Fleetwood Mac. "Is it possible that Fleetwood Mac might do another record? I can never tell you yes or no, because I don't know. I honestly don't know. It's like, do you want to take a chance of going in and setting up in a room for like a year [to record an album] and having a bunch of arguing people? And then not wanting to go on tour because you just spent a year arguing?". She also emphasised that people do not buy as many records as they used to.

On 9 June 2017, Buckingham and Christine McVie released a new album, titled Lindsey Buckingham/Christine McVie, which included contributions from Mick Fleetwood and John McVie. The album was preceded by the single "In My World". A 38-date tour began on 21 June and concluded 16 November. Fleetwood Mac also planned to embark on another tour in 2018. The band headlined the second night of the Classic West concert (on 16 July 2017 at Dodger Stadium in Los Angeles) and the second night of the Classic East concert (at New York City's Citi Field on 30 July 2017).

The band received the MusiCares Person of the Year award in 2018 and reunited to perform several songs at the Grammy-hosted gala honouring them. Artists including Lorde, Harry Styles, Little Big Town and Miley Cyrus also performed. In April 2018, the song "Dreams" re-entered the Hot Rock Songs chart at No. 16 after a viral meme had featured the song. This chart re-entry came 40 years after the song had topped the Hot 100. The song's streaming totals also translated into 7,000 "equivalent album units", a jump of 12 per cent, which helped Rumours to go from No. 21 to No. 13 on the Top Rock Albums chart.

That month, Buckingham departed from the group a second time, having reportedly been dismissed. The reason was said to have been a disagreement about the nature of the tour and in particular the question of whether newer or less well-known material would be included, as Buckingham wanted. Mick Fleetwood and the band appeared on CBS This Morning on 25 April 2018, where he said that Buckingham would not sign off on a tour that the group had been planning for a year and a half and they had reached a "huge impasse" and "hit a brick wall". When asked if Buckingham had been fired, he said, "Well, we don't use that word because I think it's ugly." He also said that "Lindsey has huge amounts of respect and kudos to what he's done within the ranks of Fleetwood Mac and always will."

In October 2018, Buckingham filed a lawsuit against Fleetwood Mac for breach of fiduciary duty, breach of oral contract, and intentional interference with prospective economic advantage, among other claims. He stated that they eventually came to a settlement, which he would not share the terms of, but claimed he was "happy enough with it". Buckingham also told his version of what had led to his departure from the band. Two days after their performance at the MusiCares event, he had a phone call from the band's manager, Irving Azoff, who had a list of things that, as Buckingham put it, "Stevie took issue with" that evening, including the guitarist's outburst just before the band's set over the intro music for their acceptance speech being the studio recording of Nicks's "Rhiannon" and the way he "smirked" during Nicks's thank-you speech. Buckingham conceded the first point. "It wasn't about it being "Rhiannon". It just undermined the impact of our entrance. That's me being very specific about the right and wrong way to do something." As for smirking, "The irony is that we have this standing joke that Stevie, when she talks, goes on a long time", Buckingham said. "I may or may not have smirked. But I look over and Christine and Mick are doing the waltz behind her as a joke." At the end of that call, Buckingham assumed Nicks was quitting Fleetwood Mac. He wrote an email to Fleetwood assuring the drummer that the group could continue. There was no reply. A couple of days later, Buckingham said, "I called Irving and said, 'This feels funny. Is Stevie leaving the band, or am I getting kicked out?'." Azoff told the guitarist he was "getting ousted" and that Nicks gave the rest of the band "an ultimatum: Either you go or she's gonna go."

Former Tom Petty and the Heartbreakers guitarist Mike Campbell and Neil Finn of Crowded House were named to replace Buckingham. On CBS This Morning, Fleetwood said that Fleetwood Mac had been reborn and that "This is the new lineup of Fleetwood Mac." Aside from touring, the band planned to record new music with Campbell and Finn in the future. The band's "An Evening with Fleetwood Mac" tour started in October 2018. The band launched the tour at the iHeartRadio Music Festival on 21 September 2018 at the T-Mobile Arena in Las Vegas.

On 8 June 2018, former Fleetwood Mac guitarist Danny Kirwan died at age 68, having contracted pneumonia earlier in the year. The British music magazine Mojo quoted Christine McVie as saying: "Danny Kirwan was the white English blues guy. Nobody else could play like him. He was a one-off. Danny and Peter [Green] gelled so well together. Danny had a very precise, piercing vibrato – a unique sound. He was a perfectionist; a fantastic musician and a fantastic writer." Kirwan's song "Tell Me All the Things You Do" from Kiln House was included in the set of the 2018–19 An Evening with Fleetwood Mac tour.

On 28 May 2020, Neil Finn, featuring Nicks and McVie with Campbell on guitar, released the song "Find Your Way Back Home" for the Auckland homeless shelter Auckland City Mission.

Founding member Peter Green died on 25 July 2020 at the age of 73.

In October 2020, Rumours again entered the Billboard top 10. The album received 30.6 million streams on streaming platforms the week of 15 October, in part due to a viral video featuring the song "Dreams".

On 30 November 2022, Christine McVie died at the age of 79. In February 2023, when asked about any further activity from the band, Fleetwood replied, "I think right now, I truly think the line in the sand has been drawn with the loss of Chris. I'd say we're done, but then we've all said that before. It's sort of unthinkable right now." He went on to say that the other surviving members have kept themselves busy with musical pursuits outside the band, and that he intends to do the same.

Tours

 Kiln House Tour – 1970
 Future Games Tour – 1971
 British Are Coming Tour – 1972
 Bare Trees Tour – 1972
 Penguin Tour – early 1973
 Mystery to Me Tour – mid-1973
 Heroes Are Hard to Find Tour – 1974
 Fleetwood Mac Tour – 1975
 Rumours Tour – 1977
 Tusk Tour – 1979–1980
 Mirage Tour – 1982
 Shake the Cage Tour – 1987–1988
 Behind the Mask Tour – 1990
 Another Link in the Chain Tour – 1994–1995
 The Dance – 1997
 Say You Will Tour – 2003–2004
 Unleashed tour – 2009
 Fleetwood Mac Live – 2013
 On with the Show – 2014–2015
 An Evening with Fleetwood Mac – 2018–2019

Band members

 Mick Fleetwood – drums, percussion (1967–1995, 1997–present)
 John McVie – bass (1967–1995, 1997–present)
Stevie Nicks – vocals (1975–1991, 1997–present)
 Mike Campbell – lead guitar, vocals (2018–present)
 Neil Finn – vocals, rhythm guitar, keyboards (2018–present)

Timeline

DiscographyStudio albums'''
 Fleetwood Mac (1968, also known as Peter Green's Fleetwood Mac)
 Mr. Wonderful (1968)
 Then Play On (1969)
 Kiln House (1970)
 Future Games (1971)
 Bare Trees (1972)
 Penguin (1973)
 Mystery to Me (1973)
 Heroes Are Hard to Find (1974)
 Fleetwood Mac (1975, also known as "The White Album")
 Rumours (1977)
 Tusk (1979)
 Mirage (1982)
 Tango in the Night (1987)
 Behind the Mask (1990)
 Time (1995)
 Say You Will (2003)

 Awards and nominations 

Grammy Awards

 Citations 

 Sources 

 Berkery, Patrick. "The Return of the Mac Daddy: Mick Fleetwood". Via ProQuest. Modern Drummer, Sep 2015. Web. Jul 2016.
 Bob Brunning, Blues: The British Connection, Helter Skelter Publishing, London 2002,  – First edition 1986 – Second edition 1995 Blues in Britain Bob Brunning, The Fleetwood Mac Story: Rumours and Lies, Omnibus Press London, 1990 and 1998, 
 Bob Brunning, Fleetwood Mac: The First 30 Years, Omnibus Press, London, 1998, 
 Caillat, Ken and Steve Steifel: Making Rumours: The Inside Story of the Classic Fleetwood Mac Album. New Jersey: Wiley, 2012. Print
 Carol Ann Harris, Storms: My Life with Lindsey Buckingham and Fleetwood Mac, Chicago Review Press, 2007, 
 Christopher Hjort, Strange brew: Eric Clapton and the British blues boom, 1965–1970, foreword by John Mayall, Jawbone 2007, 
 Dick Heckstall-Smith, The safest place in the world: A personal history of British Rhythm and blues, 1989 Quartet Books Limited,  – Second Edition : Blowing The Blues – Fifty Years Playing The British Blues, 2004, Clear Books, 
 Evans, Mike, Fleetwood Mac: The Definitive History, Sterling New York, 2011, 
 Fancourt, L., (1989) British blues on record (1957–1970), Retrack Books.
 Fleetwood, Mick, Stephen Davis and Frank Harding. My Twenty-Five Years in Fleetwood Mac. New York, NY: Hyperion, 1992. Print.
 Fleetwood, Mick, and Bozza, Anthony. Play On. New York, NY: Little, Brown, 2014. 
 Fortner, Stephen. "Filling Some Mightily High Heels with Fleetwood Mac". ProQuest. Keyboard, Jan 2016. Web. Jul 2016
 Martin Celmins, Peter Green – Founder of Fleetwood Mac, Sanctuary London, 1995, foreword by B.B. King, 
 Mick Fleetwood with Stephen Davis, Fleetwood – My Life and Adventures in Fleetwood Mac, William Morrow and Company, 1990, 
 Shapiro, Harry, Alexis Korner: The Biography, Bloomsbury Publishing PLC, London 1997, Discography by Mark Troster, 
 Unterberger, Richie, Fleetwood Mac: The Complete Illustrated History. Voyageur Press, 2017. 
 Mike Vernon, The Blue Horizon story 1965–1970 vol. 1, notes of the booklet of the Box Set (60 pages)
 Paul Myers, Long John Baldry and the Birth of the British Blues, Vancouver 2007, GreyStone Books, 

Further reading
 Silver, Murray When Elvis Meets the Dalai Lama, (Bonaventure Books, Savannah, 2005) in which the author recounts his days as a concert promoter in Atlanta, Ga., and having brought Fleetwood Mac to town for the first time in December 1969.
 Stephen Thomas Erlewine, Allmusic
 The Rolling Stone Encyclopedia of Rock & Roll'' (Simon & Schuster, 2001)

External links

 
 Fleetwood Mac on the Internet Archive
 
 

 
1967 establishments in the United Kingdom
American blues rock musical groups
American pop rock music groups
American soft rock music groups
Art pop musicians
Brit Award winners
British blues musical groups
British blues rock musical groups
British expatriates in the United States
British pop rock music groups
British soft rock music groups
Grammy Award winners
Juno Award for International Album of the Year winners
Lindsey Buckingham
Musical groups disestablished in 1996
Musical groups established in 1967
Musical groups from London
Musical groups reestablished in 1997
Musical quintets
Reprise Records artists
Stevie Nicks
Warner Records artists
Female-fronted musical groups